Sausalito Ferry Terminal is a ferry terminal in Sausalito, California, connecting Marin County and San Francisco. The station is served by Golden Gate Ferry and Blue & Gold Fleet ferries as well as Golden Gate Transit and Marin Transit bus routes.

History

The Sausalito Land and Ferry Company began running ferries between here and San Francisco around 1868. The terminal served as the southern terminus and ferry connection to San Francisco for the North Pacific Coast Railroad, which purchased the service in 1875. Pedestrian ferries were discontinued on February 28, 1941, with car ferry service ended by March, a few years after opening of the Golden Gate Bridge.

On August 15, 1970, Golden Gate Ferries began service to San Francisco along with the inauguration of bus services to the ferry terminal that day. A new dock was built in 1996.

References

External links

1970 establishments in California
Railway stations closed in 1941
Ferry terminals in the San Francisco Bay Area
Sausalito, California
Public transportation in Marin County, California
San Francisco Bay Trail
Transportation buildings and structures in Marin County, California
Railway stations in the United States opened in 1868
Former Northwestern Pacific Railroad stations